Kirill Valeryevich Klimov (born 30 January 2001) is a Russian football player who plays for FC Chayka Peschanokopskoye on loan from FC SKA-Khabarovsk.

Club career
He played for FC Lokomotiv Moscow in the 2018–19 UEFA Youth League.

He made his debut in the Russian Premier League for FC Rubin Kazan on 22 November 2020 in a game against FC Rostov. He substituted Soltmurad Bakayev in the 84th minute.

On 20 February 2021, he was loaned to FC Tambov until the end of the 2020–21 season. He scored his first RPL goal for Tambov on the closing day of the season on 16 May 2021 against FC Zenit Saint Petersburg.

In December 2021, he returned to Rubin from a loan at FC Kuban Krasnodar.

Personal life
His father Valeri Klimov is a football coach and former player.

Career statistics

References

External links
 
 

2001 births
Sportspeople from Oryol
Living people
Russian footballers
Russia youth international footballers
Russia under-21 international footballers
Association football forwards
FC Lokomotiv Moscow players
FC Rubin Kazan players
FC Tambov players
FC Urozhay Krasnodar players
FC SKA-Khabarovsk players
FC Chayka Peschanokopskoye players
Russian Premier League players
Russian First League players
Russian expatriate footballers
Expatriate footballers in Belgium
Russian expatriate sportspeople in Belgium
Expatriate footballers in France
Russian expatriate sportspeople in France